Albert Rowe may refer to:
 Albert Rowe (politician)
 Albert Rowe (physicist)